Pandit Bhajan Sopori (22 June 1948 – 2 June 2022) was an Indian instrumentalist. He was a player of the santoor, an ancient stringed musical instrument.

Early life and family 
Sopori was born in Srinagar into a Kashmiri Pandit family to Shambhu Nath Sopori on 22 June 1948. Sopori hailed from Sopore in the Baramulla district of the Kashmir Valley and traced his lineage to ancient Santoor experts. He belonged to the Sufiana gharana of Indian classical music. His family has played santoor for over six generations.
His first public performance was at a conference organised by Prayag Sangeet Samiti & the University of Allahabad when he was 10 years old.

Career 
Sopori gave his first public performance in 1953, at the age of five. He learned western classical music from Washington University & Hindustani from his grandfather S.C. Sopori and father Shambhoo Nath. 
Sopori has taught music at Washington University, US. His performances have been broadcast in India and seen by both cultural associations there and by audiences in countries such as Belgium, Egypt, England, Germany, Norway, Syria and the USA. Sopori stated that "he worked with All India Radio in 1990, when he was transferred to Delhi." & that "no music was produced from the valley. There was not even a tabla player to accompany him" when he returned.

Music Academy, SaMaPa
Pandit Sopori, considered as the cultural link between Jammu and Kashmir and rest of India, also ran a music academy called SaMaPa (Sopori Academy for Music and Performing Arts), which is actively involved in promoting Indian classical music.  SaMaPa is involved in promoting music with jail inmates, with the objective of using music for healing the prisoners and creating an emotional bond between the society & the prisoners. The academy has trained several musicians and revived old instruments. It was presented the state government dogri award in 2011.
Bhajan Sopori, in 2015, announced the SaMaPa awards for contribution to the field of music.

Awards 
Sopori was awarded the Sangeet Natak Akademi Award in 1992 and the Padma Shri in 2004. In 2009 he was honoured with the Baba Allaudin Khan Award. He was also awarded the M N Mathur award in 2011 for his contribution to Indian classical music
and Jammu and Kashmir State lifetime achievement award.

Personal life and death 
Sopori was married and had two sons. His son Abhay Rustum Sopori is also a santoor player. Sopori died in Gurugram from colon cancer on 2 June 2022 at the age of 73.

External links

References 

1948 births
2022 deaths
Hindustani instrumentalists
Recipients of the Padma Shri in arts
Recipients of the Sangeet Natak Akademi Award
Santoor players
Kashmiri people
Kashmiri musicians
People from Srinagar
Kashmiri Pandits
Indian people of Kashmiri descent